Rena Kyriakou (25 February 1917August 1994) was a pianist and composer born in Herakleion, Crete, Greece.

Education
Rena Kyriakou revealed an early aptitude for the piano and for composition, and gave her first public performance at the age of six in Athens, performing twelve original piano pieces. She studied first in Vienna under Paul Weingarten and Richard Stöhr and then in Paris under Henri Büsser and Isidor Philipp. At the age of sixteen, she was awarded the first prize for piano at the Conservatoire National de Paris.

Career
Kyriakou followed a dual career as pianist and composer. Her recorded legacy includes the complete piano music of Emmanuel Chabrier, whose works she played with idiomatic flair, and recitals of works by John Field, Joseph Haydn, Enrique Granados and Isaac Albéniz. She recorded a major survey of the piano music of Felix Mendelssohn. Her sound, both in recordings and in concert, was characterised by a wide palette of tone colour, as might be expected of a Philipp pupil. Some of the characteristic tone colour of her recordings is due to her use of a Bösendorfer Imperial Concert grand piano for at least some of them, including her Mendelssohn recordings.

She died in August 1994 in Athens.

Works
Her compositions include a piano concerto as well as solo piano pieces. Some of the more representative ones are the following: 
 6 Preludes symphoniques, Op. 8
 Les Cloches and Burlesque, Op. 9
 6 Preludes lyriques, Op.12
 5 Preludes, Op. 13
 Phantaisie, Op. 14
 Perpetuum mobile, Op. 15
 Deux pieces pour piano, Op. 16
 Theme et Variations, Op.17.

References

1917 births
1994 deaths
20th-century classical pianists
20th-century composers
Greek classical pianists
Greek women pianists
Greek classical composers
Women classical pianists
20th-century women composers
Greek expatriates in Austria
Greek expatriates in France
Musicians from Heraklion
20th-century women pianists